The anthem for a person, office or rank is music played on formal or ceremonial occasions in the presence of the person, office-holder, or rank-holder, especially by a military band. The head of state in many countries is honored with a prescribed piece of music; in some countries the national anthem serves this purpose, while others have a separate royal, presidential, or, historically, imperial anthem. Other officials may also have anthems, such as the vice-regal salute in several Commonwealth realms for the governor-general, governor, or lieutenant governor. Ruffles and flourishes may be played instead of, or preceding, such an anthem.

Examples
Countries where the national anthem is also the royal anthem include Jamaica, Malaysia, and the Netherlands. 

Other examples include the following:

Historical anthems

See also
 Fanfare

Notes

References

Anthems
Military music
 
State ritual and ceremonies